James M. Russell III is an atmospheric scientist who has served as the developer of instrumentation for several NASA probes. He is currently a professor of Planetary and Atmospheric Sciences and co-director of the Center for Atmospheric research at Hampton University.

Russell received a BSEE degree from Virginia Tech in 1962. He received an MSEE degree from the University of Virginia in 1966 and a Ph.D. in Aeronomy from the University of Michigan in 1970.

In 1960 Russell and his wife Jenna joined the Church of Jesus Christ of Latter-day Saints. He has served in many callings in the LDS church including Bishop, Stake President and Regional Representative.

Russell led the team that first identified the connection between chlorine and ozone gas depletion.

Russell was the lead investigator connected with a satellite to study ice in part of the Earth's atmosphere.

Notes

References 
 
 NASA biography
 Science Museum of Virginia biography

External links 
 Hampton University page about Russell

American atmospheric scientists
American electrical engineers
NASA people
Hampton University faculty
University of Michigan alumni
Virginia Tech alumni
Converts to Mormonism
American leaders of the Church of Jesus Christ of Latter-day Saints
University of Virginia School of Engineering and Applied Science alumni
Regional representatives of the Twelve
Latter Day Saints from Virginia
Year of birth missing (living people)
Living people